Peonidin is an O-methylated anthocyanidin derived from Cyanidin, and a primary plant pigment. Peonidin gives purplish-red hues to flowers such as the peony, from which it takes its name, and roses. It is also present in some blue flowers, such as the morning glory.

Like most anthocyanidins, it is pH sensitive, and changes from red to blue as pH rises because anthocyanidins are highly conjugated chromophores. When the pH is changed, the extent of the conjugation (of the double bonds) is altered, which alters the wavelength of light energy absorbed by the molecule. (Natural anthocyanidins are most stable in a very low pH environment; at pH 8.0, most become colorless.)  At pH 2.0, peonidin is cherry red; at 3.0 a strong yellowish pink; at 5.0 it is grape red-purple; and at 8.0 it becomes deep blue; unlike many anthocyanidins, however, it is stable at higher pH, and has been isolated as a blue colorant from the brilliant "Heavenly Blue" morning glory (Ipomoea tricolor Cav cv).

Because of its unusual color stability, a cafeyl-acylated buffered formulation of it has been patented for use as food coloring.

Peonidin, like many anthocyanidins, has shown potent inhibitory and apoptotic effects on cancer cells in vitro, notably metastatic human breast cancer cells.
A very large question, however, has been raised about anthocyanidins' penetration and retention in human cells in vivo, due to their rapid elimination from the human body.

By far the greatest dietary source of peonidin is raw cranberries, which contain 42 mg per 100 g of fruit. Blueberries, plums, grapes, and cherries also contain significant amounts, ranging from 5 to 12 mg/100 g. Only fresh fruit has been shown to contain significant peonidin; frozen blueberries have been shown to contain almost none.  Peonidin has been found in concentrations of up to 40 mg per 100 g (cooked) of certain cultivars of purple fleshed sweet potatoes; the amount of peonidin varies greatly across cultivars. It has also been isolated from raw black rice and black bananas.

The higher level of peonidin in fresh fruit corresponds to the rule of thumb that more natural fruit is healthier. Specifically, the amount of phenolic compounds in cranberries has been found to be inversely correlated with fruit size and crop yield.

List of peonidin derivatives 
 Peonidin-3-O-glucoside, found in red onion

References 

Nutrition
O-methylated anthocyanidins
Resorcinols